Gantali Pora is a village in Bijbehara tehsil, Anantnag district, of the Indian union territory of Jammu and Kashmir.  the village had a population of 713 split into 80 households with males forming 353(49.5%) of the populace and females 360(51.5). Its elevation is approximately 890m above MSL. While Urdu is the official language, Kashmiri is also mostly spoken.

History
It is believed that long ago there was a temple in a nearby village which is still present there, the village is known as Thijiwara and temple was and is still famous by chota amarnath The       hindu people used to come to the temple for prayers but they used to walk barefooted from Gantaliepora where they rang bell three times, which is the tradition of hindus. That was how Gantaliepora got its name because 'ganta' in Hindi means bell and 'pora' means piece of land.

Geography
The village of Gantalipora is located at coordinates [[33.81°N
75.1°E]] . The village has alluvial type of soil which is very fertile as fields are flooded at least five times a decade by two local river streams. There are not so much apple orchards instead the soil is perfect for rice cultivation  and mustard.

Water
The village of Gantaliepora is covered by almost 14.5% of water. Two small rivers flow through it whose average width is 9 ft (2.74 m) and 16 ft (4.87 m) respectively. Many small springs also generates from here and many water channels are also linked to fields for irrigation purposes.

References

Villages in Anantnag district